Phicol, also spelled Phichol (KJV) or Phikol, (meaning "great") was a Philistine military leader.

Phicol was the chief captain of the army of Abimelech, the Philistine king of Gerar. He entered into an alliance with Abraham with reference to a certain well which, from this circumstance, was called Beersheba, "the well of the oath" (Genesis 21:22,32; 26:26).

The Phicol mentioned in Genesis 26:26 is in relation to an agreement between Isaac and Abimelech, whereas the Phicol mentioned in Genesis 21:22, 32 is in relation to an agreement between Abraham and Abimelech.  Therefore, the name Phicol may be a namesake handed down through a generation or possibly even the name of a title (both are referred to as "commander of the army"), such as Abimelech.

References

Philistines
Book of Genesis people
Vayeira